Brihad-bhagavatamrita is a sacred text for followers of the Hindu tradition of Gaudiya Vaishnavism. Along with Hari-bhakti-vilasa, it is one of the most important works of Vaishnava theologian Sanatana Goswami.  While Hari-bhakti-vilasa sets out guidance for Vaishnava behavior and ritual, Brihad-bhagavatamrita contains an analysis of the teachings of Chaitanya from an ontological and metaphysical perspective.

Contents 
Sri Brhad-bhagavatāmṛta is divided in two cantos: Pūrva-khaṇḍa,
or first, and Uttar-khaṇḍa, or last. The name of the First Canto is Śrī
Bhagavat-kṛpā-sāra-nirdhāraṇa khaṇḍa – Ascertaining the Essence of the
Mercy of the Supreme Lord. The Second Canto is known as Śrī Golokamāhātmya-
nirūpaṇa khaṇḍa – Ascertaining the Glories of Śrī Goloka.

In the first part of Brihad-bhagavatamrita Sanatana Goswami has described a conversation between Parikshit and his mother, Uttara. It took place after Parikshit heard the Bhagavata Purana from Śuka. Uttara asked her son to explain the essence of Bhagavata Purana, and Parikshit revealed to her the stages of confidential Bhakti. He told her a story about how Narada was looking for greatest devotee of Krishna. The Great Rishi began his search with devotees of Krishna whose Bhakti was mixed with karma and jnana (Brahma and Shiva), then went up to Shanta-rasa  (Prahlada), Dasya-rasa (Hanuman), Sakhya-rasa (Arjuna), and finally came to the greatest devotee of Krishna - Uddhava, who always longed to be in Vrindavan, and showed that the highest level of Bhakti is the love of the gopis for Krishna.

The second part of Brihad-bhagavatamrita tells us about the glory and bliss of the spiritual abode Goloka, as well as of the process of renunciation of the material world, true knowledge, Bhakti Yoga, love for Krishna and implementation of the higher purpose of life. The second part contains the narrative of a wandering shepherd boy, who received a mantra from a resident of Vrindavan, travelling from one planetary system to another, exploring the different levels of consciousness of living beings. His spiritual odyssey covers Vaikuntha, Brahmaloka, Shivaloka and the heavenly planets.

Second Canto contains four chapters:

(1) Vairāgya – Renunciation
(2) Jñāna – Knowledge
(3) Bhajana – Devotional Service
(4) Vaikuṇṭha – The Spiritual World
Each of the two cantos of this scripture is a separate history. Our
worshipful author has not merely written two histories. Rather, for
facilitating the worship of the divine couple, Śrī Śrī Rādhā-Kṛṣṇa, he has thoroughly analyzed Their Lordships’ fundamental reality and nature.

Śrīmad-Bhāgavatam is the essence of all scriptures, such as the
Vedas, Vedānta, Purāṇas, Itihāsas, and so on. By churning that essence,
this book, aptly named Śrī Bṛhad-bhāgavatāmṛta – the Essential Nectar
of the Bhāgavatam – has become manifest. Throughout this book, all
topics regarding devotional service to Bhagavān have been presented.
The original discourse of the book between Śrī Jaimini and
Janamejaya is based on a conversation between Śrī Parīkṣit and
Uttarā. After Śrī Parīkṣit had heard Śrīmad-Bhāgavatam from the lips
of Śrī Śukadeva Gosvāmī, and before the snake-bird Takṣaka arrived,
Parīkṣit's mother, Śrī Uttarā-devī, said to him, “O my dear son, please
narrate to me, in simple, easy-to-understand language, the essence
of what you have heard from Śrī Śukadeva Gosvāmī.” Śrī Bṛhadbhāgavatāmṛta
begins with this inquiry.

In the Second Canto, the author examines all the manifestations
and incarnations of the Supreme Personality of Godhead, beginning
with Śrī Śālagrāma Bhagavān and ending with Śrī Nandanandana,
the beloved son of Śrī Nanda Mahārāja. This volume begins with the
history of Gopa-kumāra. Gopa-kumāra receives the gopāla-mantra from
his gurudeva. Due to the influence of this gopāla-mantra, it becomes
possible for him to travel to all abodes without restriction. First, he
takes darśana of the manifestations of Bhagavān that appear in this
earthly realm, or Bhū-maṇḍala, such as Śrī Śālagrāma Bhagavān; the
Deity manifestation of the Lord who is ensconced in the palace of the
king; and the ancient Deity of Śrī Jagannāthadeva. He sequentially
describes their progressively greater glories. Then, by the influence of
the chanting of his mantra, he reaches the planets of Svarga, Mahar,
Janas, Tapas, and Satya, where one by one he has divine vision of
the worshipable manifestations of the Lord who manifest in those
abodes. Thus he also experiences Their transcendental excellences in
succession. Yet Gopa-kumāra does not experience complete happiness
in those places.

Thereafter, he takes darśana of the manifestations of Bhagavān
that are present in the eight coverings of the universe and arrives in the abode of liberation. In mukti-loka, the realm of liberation, Gopakumāra
sees the manifestation of the brilliance of the Supreme Person,
but still, complete satisfaction eludes him. After this, in accordance
with regulative principles, he performs saṅkīrtana of the holy name,
the most prominent of the nine processes of bhakti. By the potency of
nāma-saṅkīrtana, he travels first to Vaikuṇṭha, then to Ayodhyā, and
then to Dvārakā-purī. However, because in those realms the mood of
aiśvarya, or awe and reverence for the Lord, is prominent, he cannot
freely associate with the worshipful manifestations of the Supreme
Person there.

Finally, Gopa-kumāra returns to Vṛndāvana manifest on earth,
where he executes rāgānugā bhakti, spontaneous devotional service
that follows the moods of the eternal associates of Vraja. By the potency
of his practice of rāgānugā bhakti, he attains Goloka-Vṛndāvana.
There, he obtains his cherished goal – service to Śrī Kṛṣṇa, the son of
the king of Vraja.

One should not conclude from this history that there is any
difference in the tattva, or fundamental truth, of the various
manifestations of Bhagavān. All manifestations of the Lord are
complete, from Śrī Śālagrāma Bhagavān to Śrī Nandanandana
(Kṛṣṇa, the darling son of Nanda Mahārāja). From the perspective
of tattva, They are one, yet from the perspective of rasa, or the
sweetness of transcendental relationships, Śrī Nandanandana is the
most excellent.

Brihad-bhagavatamrita contains descriptions of the various categories of devotees of Krishna: close devotees, and devotees of the closest devotees. Bhaktivedanta Swami Prabhupada in his comments to the Chaitanya-charitamrita (Adi Lila, 5.203) writes that anyone who wants to learn about the devotees and about devotional service to Krishna should read Brihad-bhagavatamrita.

Notes

References

Gaudiya Vaishnavism
16th-century literature
Hindu texts